Vachellia is a genus of flowering plants in the legume family, Fabaceae, commonly known as thorn trees or acacias. It belongs to the subfamily Mimosoideae. Its species were considered members of genus Acacia until 2009. Vachellia can be distinguished from other acacias by its capitate inflorescences and spinescent stipules. Before discovery of the New World, Europeans in the Mediterranean region were familiar with several species of Vachellia, which they knew as sources of medicine, and had names for them that they inherited from the Greeks and Romans.

The wide-ranging genus occurs in a variety of open, tropical to subtropical habitats, and is locally dominant. In parts of Africa, Vachellia species are shaped progressively by grazing animals of increasing size and height, such as gazelle, gerenuk, and giraffe. The genus in Africa has thus developed thorns in defence against such herbivory.

Nomenclature
By 2005, taxonomists had decided that Acacia sensu lato should be split into at least five separate genera. The ICN dictated that under these circumstances, the name of Acacia should remain with the original type, which was Acacia nilotica. However, that year the General Committee of the IBC decided that Acacia should be given a new type (Acacia verticillatum) so that the ~920 species of Australian acacias would not need to be renamed Racosperma. This decision was opposed by 54.9% or 247 representatives at its 2005 congress, while 45.1% or 203 votes were cast in favor. However, since a 60% vote was required to override the committee, the decision was carried, and a nom. cons. propositum was listed in Appendix III (p. 286). The 2011 congress voted 373 to 172 to uphold the 2005 decision, which means that the name Acacia and a new type follow the majority of the species in Acacia sensu lato, rather than this genus. However, some members of the botanical community remain unconvinced, and the use of Acacia in the scientific literature continues to exceed the use of the new generic names.

Description
The members of Vachellia are trees or shrubs, sometimes climbing, and are always armed. Younger plants, especially, are armed with spines which are modified stipules, situated near the leaf bases. Some (cf. V. tortilis, V. luederitzii and V. reficiens) are also armed with paired, recurved prickles (in addition to the spines). The leaves are alternate and bipinnately arranged, and their pinnae are usually opposite. The racemose inflorescences usually grow from the leaf axils. The yellow or creamy white flowers are produced in spherical heads, or seldom in elongate spikes, which is the general rule in the related genus Senegalia. The flowers are typically bisexual with numerous stamens, but unisexual flowers have been noted in V. nilotica (cf. Sinha, 1971). The calyx and corolla are usually 4 to 5-lobed. Glands are usually present on the rachis and the upper side of the petiole. The seed pod may be straight, curved or curled, and either dehiscent or indehiscent.

Species list
Of the 163 species currently assigned to Vachellia, 52 are native to the Americas, 83 to Africa, Madagascar and the Mascarene Islands, 32 to Asia and 9 to Australia and the Pacific Islands. Vachellia comprises the following species:

 Vachellia abyssinica (Hochst. ex. Benth.) Kyal. & Boatwr.—flat top acacia
 subsp. abyssinica (Hochst. ex. Benth.) Kyal. & Boatwr.
 subsp. calophylla (Brenan) Kyal. & Boatwr.
 Vachellia acuifera (Benth.) Seigler & Ebinger—Bahama acacia, cassip, pork-and-doughboy, (Bahamas) rosewood
 Vachellia albicortata (Burkart) Seigler & Ebinger
 Vachellia allenii (D. H. Janzen) Seigler & Ebinger—Allen acacia
 Vachellia amythethophylla (Steud. ex A.Rich.) Kyal. & Boatwr.
 Vachellia ancistroclada (Brenan) Kyal. & Boatwr.
 Vachellia anegadensis (Britton) Seigler & Ebinger—Anegada acacia, blackbrush-wattle, pokemeboy
 Vachellia antunesii (Harms) Kyal. & Boatwr.
 Vachellia arenaria (Schinz) Kyal. & Boatwr.—sand acacia
 Vachellia aroma (Gillies ex Hook. & Arn.) Seigler & Ebinger
 var. aroma Gillies ex Hook. & Arn.
 var. huarango Ruíz & J.Macbr.
 Vachellia astringens (Gillies in Hook. et Arn.) Speg.

 Vachellia baessleri Clarke, Siegler & Ebinger
 Vachellia barahonensis (Urb. & Ekman) Seigler & Ebinger
 Vachellia bavazzanoi (Pichi-Sermolli) Kyal. & Boatwr.
 Vachellia belairioides (Urb.) Seigler & Ebinger—Bellair acacia
 Vachellia bellula (Drake) Boatwr.
 Vachellia biaciculata (S. Watson) Seigler & Ebinger—corkwood wattle, dogwood
 Vachellia bidwillii (Benth.) Kodela—corkwood wattle, dogwood. "'Waneu', of the aboriginals of Central Queensland ; 'Yadthor', of those of the Cloncurry River, Northern Queensland."
 Vachellia bilimekii (J. Macbr.) Seigler & Ebinger
 Vachellia bolei (R.P. Subhedar) Ragupathy, Seigler, Ebinger & Maslin
 Vachellia borleae (Burtt Davy) Kyal. & Boatwr.—sticky acacia, named for the collector Jeanne M. Borle.
 Vachellia brandegeana (I. M. Johnst.) Seigler & Ebinger—Baja California acacia
 Vachellia bravoensis (Isely) Seigler & Ebinger
 Vachellia bricchettiana (Chiov.) Kyal. & Boatwr.
 Vachellia bucheri (Marie-Victorín) Seigler & Ebinger—Bucher acacia
 Vachellia bullockii (Brenan) Kyal. & Boatwr.
 var. bullockii (Brenan) Kyal. & Boatwr.
 var. induta (Brenan) Kyal. & Boatwr.
 Vachellia burttii (Bak. f.) Kyal. & Boatwr.
 Vachellia bussei (Harms ex Sjöstedt) Kyal. & Boatwr.
 Vachellia californica (Brandegee) Seigler & Ebinger
 Vachellia campechiana (Mill.) Seigler & Ebinger—boatthorn acacia, spoon-thorn acacia
 f. campechiana (Mill.) Seigler & Ebinger
 f. houghii (Britton & Rose) Seigler & Ebinger
 Vachellia caurina (Barneby & Zanoni) Seigler & Ebinger
 Vachellia caven (Molina) Seigler & Ebinger
 var. caven (Molina) Seigler & Ebinger
 var. dehiscens (Ciald.) Seigler & Ebinger
 var. microcarpa  (Speg.) Seigler & Ebinger
 var. stenocarpa  (Speg.) Seigler & Ebinger
 Vachellia cernua (Thulin & Hassan) Kyal. & Boatwr.
 Vachellia chiapensis (Saff.) Seigler & Ebinger—Chiapas acacia
 Vachellia choriophylla (Benth.) Seigler & Ebinger—cinnecord acacia, Florida acacia, (Bahamas) cinnecord
 Vachellia clarksoniana (Pedley) Kodela
 Vachellia collinsii (Saff.) Seigler & Ebinger—Collins acacia
 Vachellia constricta (Benth.) Seigler & Ebinger—Whitethorn acacia, Mescat acacia
 Vachellia cookii (Saff.) Seigler & Ebinger—Cook acacia, cockspur acacia
 Vachellia cornigera (L.) Seigler & Ebinger—bullhorn wattle, bull's-horn acacia, bull-horn thorn, oxhorn acacia
 Vachellia cucuyo (Barneby & Zanoni) Seigler & Ebinger—Cucuyo acacia
 Vachellia curvifructa (Burkart) Seigler & Ebinger
 Vachellia daemon (Ekman & Urb.) Seigler & Ebinger—Camagüey acacia
 Vachellia davyi (N.E.Br.) Kyal. & Boatwr.—corky-bark acacia

 Vachellia ditricha (Pedley) Kodela
 Vachellia dolichocephala (Harms) Kyal. & Boatwr.
 Vachellia douglasica (Pedley) Kodela
 Vachellia drepanolobium (Harms ex Sjöstedt) P.J.H. Hurter—whistling thorn
 Vachellia dyeri (P.P.Swartz) Kyal. & Boatwr.
 Vachellia eburnea (L.f.) P. Hurter & Mabb.
 Vachellia ebutsiniorum (P.J.H. Hurter) Kyal. & Boatwr.—Ebutsini acacia
 Vachellia edgeworthii (T.Anders.) Kyal. & Boatwr.
 Vachellia elatior (Brenan) Kyal. & Boatwr.
 subsp. elatior (Brenan) Kyal. & Boatwr.
 subsp. turkanae (Brenan) Kyal. & Boatwr.
 Vachellia erioloba (E.Mey.) P.J.H. Hurter—camel thorn (Kameeldoring)
 Vachellia erythrophloea (Brenan) Kyal. & Boatwr.
 Vachellia etbaica (Schweinf.) Kyal. & Boatwr.—savannah thorn
 subsp. australis (Brenan) Kyal. & Boatwr.
 subsp. etbaica (Schweinf.) Kyal. & Boatwr.
 subsp. platycarpa (Brenan) Kyal. & Boatwr.
 subsp. uncinata (Brenan) Kyal. & Boatwr.
 Vachellia exuvialis (Verdoorn) Kyal. & Boatwr.—flaky-bark acacia
 Vachellia farnesiana (L.) Wight & Arn.—huisache
 var. farnesiana (L.) Wight & Arn.
 var. guanacastensis (H.D.Clarke et al.) Wight & Arn.
 var. minuta (M.E.Jones) Wight & Arn.
 var. pinetorum (F.J.Herm.) Wight & Arn.—pineland wattle
 Vachellia fischeri (Harms) Kyal. & Boatwr.—flat-topped thorn
 Vachellia flava (Forssk.) Kyal. & Boatwr.
 Vachellia gentlei (Standley) Seigler & Ebinger—gentle acacia
 Vachellia gerrardii (Benth.) P.J.H. Hurter—red acacia
 var. calvescens (Brenan) P.J.H. Hurter
 var. gerrardii (Benth.) P.J.H. Hurter
 var. latisiliqua (Brenan) P.J.H. Hurter
 Vachellia glandulifera (S. Watson) Seigler & Ebinger
 Vachellia globulifera (Saff.) Seigler & Ebinger—globular acacia
 Vachellia grandicornuta (Gerstner) Seigler & Ebinger—horned-thorn acacia
 Vachellia guanacastensis (Clark, Seigler, & Ebinger) Seigler & Ebinger
 Vachellia gummifera (Willd.) Kyal. & Boatwr.—gum-bearing acacia
 Vachellia haematoxylon (Willd.) Seigler & Ebinger—gray camel thorn, giraffe thorn
 Vachellia harmandiana (Pierre) Maslin, Seigler & Ebinger
 Vachellia hebeclada (DC.) Kyal. & Boatwr.—candle-pod acacia
 subsp. chobiensis (O.B.Miller) Kyal. & Boatwr.
 subsp. hebeclada (DC.) Kyal. & Boatwr.
 subsp. tristis (A.Schreiber) Kyal. & Boatwr.
 Vachellia hindsii (Benth.) Seigler & Ebinger—Hinds acacia
 Vachellia hockii (De Wild.) Seigler & Ebinger
 Vachellia horrida (L.) Kyal. & Boatwr.—long white-galled acacia
 subsp. benadirensis (Chiov.) Kyal. & Boatwr.
 subsp. horrida (L.) Kyal. & Boatwr.
 Vachellia hydaspica (J.R. Drumm. ex R. Parker) Ali
 Vachellia inopinata (Prain) Maslin, Seigler & Ebinger
 Vachellia insulae-iacobi (L. Riley) Seigler & Ebinger

 Vachellia jacquemontii (Benth.) ali—baonḷī, raati-banwali
 Vachellia janzenii (Ebinger & Seigler) Seigler & Ebinger—Janzen acacia
 Vachellia karroo (Hayne) Banfi & Galasso—Karroo Bush
 Vachellia kingii (Prain) Maslin, Seigler & Ebinger
 Vachellia kirkii (Oliv.) Kyal. & Boatwr.—flood plain acacia
 subsp. kirkii (Oliv.) Kyal. & Boatwr.
 var. kirkii (Oliv.) Kyal. & Boatwr.
 var. sublaevis (Brenan) Kyal. & Boatwr.
 subsp. mildbraedii (Harms) Kyal. & Boatwr.
 Vachellia koltermanii R. García, M. Mejía, Ebinger, & Seigler
 Vachellia kosiensis (P.P.Sw. ex Coates Palgr.) Kyal. & Boatwr.—dune acacia, dune sweet-thorn
 Vachellia lahai (Steud. & Hochst. ex. Benth.) Kyal. & Boatwr.—red-thorn acacia
 Vachellia lasiopetala (Oliv.) Kyal. & Boatwr.
 Vachellia latispina (J.E.Burrows & S.M.Burrows) Kyal. & Boatwr.
 Vachellia leucophloea (Roxb.) Maslin, Seigler & Ebinger—pilang
 var. leucophloea (Roxb.) Maslin, Seigler & Ebinger
 var. microcephala (Kurz) Maslin, Seigler & Ebinger
 Vachellia leucospira (Brenan) Kyal. & Boatwr.
 Vachellia luederitzii (Engl.) Kyal. & Boatwr.—bastard umbrella thorn
 var. luederitzii (Engl.) Kyal. & Boatwr.—Kalahari-sand acacia
 var. retinens (Sim) Kyal. & Boatwr.—balloon-thorn acacia

 Vachellia macracantha (Humb. & Bonpl. ex Willd.) Seigler & Ebinger—longspine acacia, French casha, long-spine acacia, porknut, cambrón, long-spined acacia, (Jamaica) parknut, (Virgin Islands) wild tamarind, (Netherlands Antilles) Creole casha, Spanish casha, steel acacia, (Virgin Islands) stink casha, strink casha
 Vachellia macrothyrsa (Harms) Kyal. & Boatwr.
 Vachellia malacocephala (Harms) Kyal. & Boatwr.—black-galled acacia
 Vachellia mayana (Lundell) Seigler & Ebinger—Maya Acacia

 Vachellia mbuluensis (Brenan) Kyal. & Boatwr.—hairy-galled acacia
 Vachellia melanoceras (Beurl.) Seigler & Ebinger—blackthorn acacia, bullhorn acacia
 Vachellia montana (P.P.Swartz) Kyal. & Boatwr.
 Vachellia myaingii (Lace) Maslin, Seigler & Ebinger
 Vachellia myrmecophila (R.Vig.) Boatwr.
 Vachellia natalitia (E.Mey.) Kyal. & Boatwr.—pale-bark acacia, pale-bark sweet thorn
 Vachellia nebrownii (Burtt Davy) Seigler & Ebinger—water acacia, water thorn
 Vachellia negrii (Pichi-Sermolli) Kyal. & Boatwr.
Vachellia nilotica (L.) P.J.H. Hurter & Mabb.—scented-pod acacia, gum Arabic tree, babul, Amrad gum, thorny mimosa of India
 subsp. adstringens (Schumach. & Thonn.) P.J.H. Hurter & Mabb.
 subsp. cupressiformis (J.L.Stewart) P.J.H. Hurter & Mabb.
 subsp. hemispherica (Ali & Faruqi) P.J.H. Hurter & Mabb.
 subsp. indica (Benth.) P.J.H. Hurter & Mabb.—Babul, Prickly acacia
 subsp. kraussiana (Benth.) P.J.H. Hurter & Mabb.
 subsp. leiocarpa (Brenan) P.J.H. Hurter & Mabb.
 subsp. nilotica (L.) P.J.H. Hurter & Mabb.
 subsp. subalata (Vatke) P.J.H. Hurter & Mabb.
 subsp. tomentosa (Benth.) P.J.H. Hurter & Mabb.
 Vachellia nubica (Benth.) Kyal. & Boatwr.

 Vachellia oerfota (Forssk) Kyal. & Boatwr.
 var. brevifolia (Boulos) Kyal. & Boatwr.
 var. oerfota (Forssk) Kyal. & Boatwr.
 Vachellia origena (Hunde) Kyal. & Boatwr.
 Vachellia ormocarpoides (P.J.H. Hurter) Kyal. & Boatwr.—Leolo thorn
 Vachellia oviedoensis (R. García & M. Mejía) Seigler & Ebinger
 Vachellia pacensis (Rudd & Carter) Seigler & Ebinger
 Vachellia pachyphloia (W. Fitzg.) Kodela
 subsp. brevipinnula (Tindale & Kodela) Kodela
 subsp. pachyphloia (W. Fitzg.) Kodela
 Vachellia pallidifolia (Tindale) Kodela
 Vachellia paolii (Chiov.) Kyal. & Boatwr.
 subsp. paolii (Chiov.) Kyal. & Boatwr.
 subsp. paucijuga (Brenan) Kyal. & Boatwr.

 Vachellia pennatula (Schltdl. & Cham.) Seigler & Ebinger—feather acacia
 var. parvicephala Seigler & Ebinger
 var. pennatula (Schltdl. & Cham.) Seigler & Ebinger
 Vachellia permixta (Burtt Davy) Kyal. & Boatwr.—slender acacia
 Vachellia pilispina (Pichi-Sermolli) Kyal. & Boatwr.—mpande
 Vachellia polypyrigenes (Greenm.) Seigler & Ebinger
 Vachellia prasinata (Hunde) Kyal. & Boatwr.
 Vachellia pringlei (Rose) Seigler & Ebinger—Pringle acacia
 var. californica —California Pringle acacia
 var. pringlei (Rose) Seigler & Ebinger—typical Pringle acacia

 Vachellia pseudofistula (Harms) Kyal. & Boatwr.—ant-galled acacia
 Vachellia qandalensis (Thulin) Kyal. & Boatwr.
 Vachellia quintanilhae (Torre) Kyal. & Boatwr.
 Vachellia reficiens (Wawra) Kyal. & Boatwr.—red-bark acacia
 subsp. misera (Vatke) Kyal. & Boatwr.
 subsp. reficiens (Wawra) Kyal. & Boatwr.
 Vachellia rehmanniana (Schinz) Kyal. & Boatwr.—silky acacia
 Vachellia rigidula (Benth.) Seigler & Ebinger—blackbrush acacia, blackbrush
 Vachellia robbertsei (P.P.Swartz) Kyal. & Boatwr.—Sekhukhune acacia
 Vachellia robusta (Burch.) Kyal. & Boatwr.—splendid acacia
 subsp. clavigera (E.Mey.) Kyal. & Boatwr.—river acacia
 subsp. robusta (Burch.) Kyal. & Boatwr.—robust acacia
 subsp. usambarensis (Taub.) Kyal. & Boatwr.

 Vachellia roigii (Léon) Seigler & Ebinger—Roig acacia
 Vachellia rorudiana (Christopherson) Seigler & Ebinger—Galapagos acacia
 Vachellia ruddiae (D. H. Janzen) Seigler & Ebinger—Rudd acacia
 Vachellia schaffneri (S. Watson) Seigler & Ebinger—Schaffner's wattle, twisted acacia
 var. bravoensis (Isely) Seigler & Ebinger
 var. schaffneri (S. Watson) Seigler & Ebinger
 Vachellia schottii (Torr.) Seigler & Ebinger—Schott's wattle
 Vachellia sekhukhuniensis (P.J.H. Hurter) Kyal. & Boatwr.—Sekhukhune thorn
 Vachellia seyal (Delile) P.J.H. Hurter—white whistling thorn
 var. fistula (Schweinf.) P.J.H. Hurter
 var. seyal (Delile) P.J.H. Hurter
 Vachellia siamensis (Craib) Maslin, Seigler & Ebinger
 Vachellia sieberiana (DC.) Kyal. & Boatwr.—paperbark acacia, paperbark thorn
 var. sieberiana (DC.) Kyal. & Boatwr.
 var. villosa (A.Chev.) Kyal. & Boatwr.
 var. woodii (Burtt Davy) Kyal. & Boatwr.
 Vachellia sphaerocephala (Schltdl. & Cham.) Seigler & Ebinger—roundhead acacia, bee wattle
 Vachellia stuhlmannii (Taub.) Kyal. & Boatwr.—olive-barked thorn, vlei acacia
 Vachellia suberosa (A. Cunn. ex Benth.) Kodela—corkybark wattle
 Vachellia sutherlandii (F. Muell.) Kodela—corkwood wattle
 Vachellia swazica (Burtt Davy) Kyal. & Boatwr.—Swazi acacia
 Vachellia tenuispina (Verdoorn) Kyal. & Boatwr.—turf acacia
 Vachellia tephrophylla (Thulin) Kyal. & Boatwr.
 Vachellia theronii (P.P.Sw.) Boatwr.—slender mountain thorn
 Vachellia tomentosa (Rottler) Maslin, Seigler & Ebinger—klampis
 Vachellia torrei (Brenan) Kyal. & Boatwr.—Mozambique sticky thorn
 Vachellia tortilis (Forssk.) Galasso & Banfi—umbrella thorn, umbrella acacia
 subsp. heteracantha (Burch.) Galasso & Banfi
 subsp. raddiana (Savi) Galasso & Banfi
 var. pubescens (A.Chev.) Galasso & Banfi
 var. raddiana (Savi) Galasso & Banfi
 subsp. spirocarpa (Hochst. ex A.Rich.) Galasso & Banfi
 var. crinita (Chiov.) Galasso & Banfi
 var. spirocarpa (Hochst. ex. A.Rich.) Galasso & Banfi
 subsp. tortilis (Forssk.) Galasso & Banfi
 Vachellia tortuosa (L.) Seigler & Ebinger—twisted acacia, acacia bush, casia, catclaw, Dutch casha, huisachillo, Rio Grande acacia, sweet briar, sweet-briar, wild poponax
 Vachellia turnbulliana (Brenan) Kyal. & Boatwr.—velvet pod acacia
 Vachellia valida (Tindale & Kodela) Kodela
 Vachellia vernicosa (Britton & Rose) Seigler & Ebinger—viscid acacia
 Vachellia viguieri (Villiers & Du Puy) Boatwr.
 Vachellia villaregalis (McVaugh) Seigler & Ebinger
 Vachellia walwalensis (Gilliland) Kyal. & Boatwr.

 Vachellia xanthophloea (Benth.) P.J.H. Hurter—fever tree
 Vachellia zanzibarica (S.Moore) Kyal. & Boatwr.—coastal whistling thorn
 var. microphylla (Brenan) Kyal. & Boatwr.
 var. zanzibarica (S.Moore) Kyal. & Boatwr.

 Vachellia zapatensis (Urb. & Ekman) Seigler & Ebinger

Incertae sedis
These species are suspected to belong to Vachellia, but have not been formally transferred.
 Acacia callicoma Meisn.
 Acacia harala Thulin & Gifri
 Acacia hunteri Oliv.
 Acacia johnwoodii Boulos
 Acacia planifrons Koenig ex Wight & Arn.
 Acacia pseudo-eburnea J.R. Drumm. ex Dunn
 Acacia tanjorensis Ragup., Thoth. & Mahad.
 Acacia yemenensis Boulos

Hybrids
 Vachellia × cedilloi (Rico Arce) Seigler & Ebinger
 Vachellia campechiana × pennatula
 Vachellia erioloba × haematoxylon
 Vachellia × gladiata (Saff.) Seigler & Ebinger
 Vachellia kirkii × seyal
 Vachellia macracantha × pennatula
 Vachellia seyal var. fistula × xanthophloea
 Vachellia × standleyi (Saff.) Seigler & Ebinger

References

 
Fabaceae genera